Sarah Sophia Banks (28 October 1744 – 27 September 1818) was an English antiquarian collector and sister and collaborator of botanist Joseph Banks.  She collected coins and medals and ephemera which are now historically valuable like broadsheets, newspaper clippings, visiting cards, prints, advertisements and playbills.

Biography

She was born on 28 October 1744 at 30 Argyll Street in Soho, London the daughter of William Banks, the Member of Parliament for Grampound, and his wife Sarah.

She "discussed questions of plant biology with her brother..." and "...influenced him greatly." Many "of her ideas made their way into his writings [and she] also provided valuable support by recopying and editing the entire manuscript of Banks' Newfoundland voyage (published 1766)."

Legacy

Her varied collections were left to her brother and sister-in-law who presented them to the British Museum and the Royal Mint Museum. Her coin collection is now divided between the British Museum and the Royal Mint, while her prints are housed between the British Museum and British Library. The rediscovery of her scrapbook on the London Monster, a man who attacked dozens of women 1788–90, led directly to Jan Bondeson's book on the subject in 2000.

Ancestry

Further reading
Catherine Eagleton, "Collecting African money in Georgian London: Sarah Sophia Banks and her collection of coins", Museum History Journal, vol. 6, no. 1, 2013, pp. 23–38.
Catherine Eagleton, "Collecting America: Sarah Sophia Banks and the 'Continental Dollar' of 1776", Numismatic Chronicle, vol. 174, 2014, pp. 293–301.
Arlene Leis, "Displaying Art and Fashion: Ladies' Pocket-Book Imagery in the Paper Collections of Sarah Sophia Banks", Konsthistorisk Tidskrift, vol. 82, no. 3, 2013, pp. 252–71.
Arlene Leis, "Ephemeral Histories: Social Commemoration of the Revolutionary and Napoleonic Wars in the paper Collections of Sarah Sophia Banks" in Satish Padiyar, Phillip Shaw and Philippa Simpson (eds.) Visual Culture and the Revolutionary and Napoleonic Wars, Routledge, London and New York, 2017, pp. 183–199.
Arlene Leis, "A Truly Interesting Collection of Visiting Cards and Co' in Toby Burrows and Cynthia Johnston (eds.) Collecting the Past:British Collectors and Their Collections 18th to the 20th Centuries (Routledge, 2019)
Anthony Pincott, "The Book Tickets of Sarah Sophia Banks", The Bookplate Journal, vol. 2, no.1, March 2004, pp. 3–30.

References

External links
 British Museum Collection Online – over 14,000 objects from her collection which are now at the British Museum

1744 births
1818 deaths
Collectors from London
Women collectors
Women botanists
English numismatists
Women numismatists
18th-century women scientists
19th-century British women scientists
18th-century British scientists
19th-century British scientists
British women historians
People from Soho